Lucjan Avgustini (28 August 1963 – 22 May 2016) was an Albanian prelate of the Catholic Church who served as the bishop of Sapë.

Avgustini was born in Ferizaj, SFR Yugoslavia. From 1989 to 2006 he was a priest of the Apostolic Administration of Prizren, while since 2006 he was the bishop of Sapë in Albania, until his death in 2016.

References 

1963 births
2016 deaths
People from Ferizaj
Kosovo Albanians
Kosovan Roman Catholic bishops
Bishops appointed by Pope Benedict XVI
21st-century Roman Catholic bishops in Albania